Tomislav Gomelt (born 7 January 1995) is a Croatian professional footballer who plays as a midfielder for Croatian club Rudeš.

Club career
Gomelt started his youth career at his hometown club HNK Segesta before moving on to NK Zagreb. A youth international, he drew attention from clubs all over Europe, trialing at Inter Milan, Juventus and Genoa, but was unable to transfer due to bureaucratic reasons and regulations. Another trial followed, at Manchester City, with a similar outcome, and Gomelt moved to HAŠK Zagreb. In the end, Gomelt joined the English Premier League side Tottenham Hotspur and had a spell on loan with Spanish side RCD Espanyol B in 2013 as he was unable to play competitive games on his arrival, because Croatia were outside the EU at the time. Gomelt spent the 2013–14 season on loan at Belgian Second Division outfit Royal Antwerp.

He joined Italian Serie B side Bari on loan in September 2014 and made his professional debut for them in December 2014 playing against Carpi. In July 2015, Gomelt joined Bari on a free transfer after being released by Spurs.

On 14 June 2017, Gomelt signed a three-year contract with HNK Rijeka in Croatia. The following 31 January, he was loaned to Segunda División side Lorca FC until June.

He joined Dinamo București in Romania in the summer of 2018.

On 21 January 2019, he moved to Italy, signing a 2.5-year contract with Crotone.

On 18 January 2021, Gomelt signed for ADO Den Haag.

On 28 January he signed with Lithuanian side FK Sūduva.

Honours

Club
CFR Cluj
Cupa României: 2015–16

References

External links
 
 

1995 births
Living people
People from Sisak
Association football midfielders
Croatian footballers
Croatia youth international footballers
Tottenham Hotspur F.C. players
RCD Espanyol B footballers
Royal Antwerp F.C. players
S.S.C. Bari players
CFR Cluj players
HNK Rijeka players
Lorca FC players
FC Dinamo București players
F.C. Crotone players
ADO Den Haag players
FK Sūduva Marijampolė players
Primera Federación players
Challenger Pro League players
Serie B players
Liga I players
Croatian Football League players
Segunda División players
Serie A players
Eredivisie players
A Lyga players
Croatian expatriate footballers
Expatriate footballers in Belgium
Expatriate footballers in England
Expatriate footballers in Italy
Expatriate footballers in Romania
Expatriate footballers in Spain
Expatriate footballers in the Netherlands
Croatian expatriate sportspeople in Belgium
Croatian expatriate sportspeople in England
Croatian expatriate sportspeople in Italy
Croatian expatriate sportspeople in Spain
Croatian expatriate sportspeople in Romania
Croatian expatriate sportspeople in the Netherlands